Michele de Franchis (6 April 1875, Palermo – 19 February 1946, Palermo) was an Italian mathematician, specializing in algebraic geometry. He is known for the De Franchis theorem and the Castelnuovo–de Franchis theorem.

He received his laurea in 1896 from the University of Palermo, where he was taught by Giovanni Battista Guccia and Francesco Gerbaldi. De Franchis was appointed in 1905 Professor of Algebra and Analytic Geometry at the University of Cagliari and then in 1906 moved to the University of Parma, where he was appointed professor of Projective and Descriptive Geometry and remained until 1909.  From 1909 to 1914 he was a professor at the University of Catania. In 1914, upon the death of Guccia, he was appointed as Guccia's successor in the chair Analytic and Projective Geometry at the University of Palermo.

In 1909 Michele de Franchis and Giuseppe Bagnera were awarded the Prix Bordin of the Académie des Sciences of Paris for their work on hyperelliptic surfaces. De Franchis and Bagnera were Invited Speakers at the ICM in 1908 in Rome.

Among de Franchis's students are Margherita Beloch, Maria Ales, and Antonino Lo Voi.

References

External links
Indice del volume dedicato a De Franchis dai Rendiconti del Circolo Matematico di Palermo
Bibliography, Università di Padova

1875 births
1946 deaths
Algebraic geometers
Italian algebraic geometers
20th-century Italian mathematicians
University of Palermo alumni
Academic staff of the University of Catania
Academic staff of the University of Palermo
Mathematicians from Sicily